Rhynchomesostoma is a genus of rhabdocoel flatworms in the family Typhloplanidae.

Species
 Rhynchomesostoma inaliensis Norena-Janssen, 1995
 Rhynchomesostoma lutheri Papi, 1963
 Rhynchomesostoma rostratum (Müller OF, 1773)

References

Rhabdocoela
Platyhelminthes genera